Semyon Petrovich Babayevsky (Семён Петрович Бабаевский, June 6, 1909, Kunye, Izyumsky Uyezd, Kharkov Governorate, Russian Empire - March 28, 2000, Moscow, Russian Federation) was a Soviet writer, three times Stalin Prize laureate, best known for his novel The Golden Star Chavalier (1947-1948) and the second part of it, Light Above the Land (1949-1950).

References 

1909 births
2000 deaths
People from Kharkiv Oblast
People from Izyumsky Uyezd
Communist Party of the Soviet Union members
Third convocation members of the Supreme Soviet of the Soviet Union
Fourth convocation members of the Supreme Soviet of the Soviet Union
Stalin Prize winners
Recipients of the Order of the Red Banner of Labour
Socialist realism writers
Soviet male writers
Soviet novelists
Soviet short story writers
Maxim Gorky Literature Institute alumni